Carrion flowers, also known as corpse flowers or stinking flowers, are mimetic flowers that emit an odor that smells like rotting flesh. Apart from the scent, carrion flowers often display additional characteristics that contribute to the mimesis of a decaying corpse. These include their specific coloration (red, purple, brown), the presence of setae and orifice-like flower architecture. Carrion flowers attract mostly scavenging flies and beetles as pollinators. Some species may trap the insects temporarily to ensure the gathering and transfer of pollen.

Plants known as "carrion flower"

Amorphophallus 
Many plants in the genus Amorphophallus (family Araceae) are known as carrion flowers. One such plant is the Titan arum (Amorphophallus titanum), which has the world's largest unbranched inflorescence. Rather than a single flower, the titan arum presents an inflorescence or compound flower composed of a spadix or stalk of small and anatomically reduced male and female flowers, surrounded by a spathe that resembles a single giant petal. This plant has a mechanism to heat up the spadix enhancing the emission of the strong odor of decaying meat to attract its pollinators, carrion-eating beetles and "flesh flies" (family Sarcophagidae). It was first described scientifically in 1878 in Sumatra.

Rafflesia 
Flowers of plants in the genus Rafflesia (family Rafflesiaceae) emit an odor similar to that of decaying meat. This odor attracts the flies that pollinate the plant. The world's largest single bloom is R. arnoldii. This rare flower is found in the rainforests of Borneo and Sumatra. R. arnoldii is a parasitic plant on Tetrastigma vine, which grows only in primary rainforests. It has no visible leaves, roots, or stem. It does not photosynthesize, but rather uses the host plant to obtain water and nutrients.

Stapelia 
Plants in the genus Stapelia are also called "carrion flowers". They are small, spineless, cactus-like succulent plants.  Most species are native to South Africa, and are grown as potted plants elsewhere. The flowers of all species are hairy to varying degrees and generate the odor of rotten flesh. The color of the flowers also mimics rotting meat. This attracts scavenging flies, for pollination. The flowers in some species can be very large, notably Stapelia gigantea can reach  in diameter.

Smilax or Nemexia 
In North America, the herbaceous vines of the genus Smilax are known as carrion flowers. These plants have a cluster of small greenish flowers. The most familiar member of this groups is Smilax herbacea. These plants are sometimes placed in the genus Nemexia.

Bulbophyllum (Orchid) 

Orchids of the genus Bulbophyllum produce strongly scentend flowers.  The flowers produce various odors resembling sap, urine, blood, dung, carrion, and, in some species, fragrant fruity aromas. Most are fly-pollinated, and attract hordes of flies. Bulbophyllum beccarii, Bulbophyllum fletcherianum and Bulbophyllum phalaenopsis in bloom have been likened to smelling like a herd of dead elephants.  Their overpowering floral odors are sometimes described as making it difficult to walk into a greenhouse in which they in bloom.

Scent
The sources of the flowers' unique scent are not fully identified, partly due to the extremely low concentration of the compounds (5 to 10 parts per billion). Biochemical tests on Amorphophallus species revealed foul-smelling dimethyl sulfides such as dimethyl disulfide and dimethyl trisulfide, and in other species, trace amounts of amines such as putrescine and cadaverine have been found. Methyl thiolacetate (which has a cheesy, garlic-like odor) and isovaleric acid (smells of sweat) also contribute to the smell of the flower. Trimethylamine is the cause of the "rotten fish smell" towards the end of the flower's life.

Pollination 
Both visual interactions and odor are important attractants for pollinators. In order for pollination to occur, a relationship of attraction and reward must be present between the flower and the pollinator. The pollinator's body mechanically promotes pollen adherence, which is necessary for effective pollen dispersal. The recognizable scent of the carrion flowers is produced in the petals of both male and female flowers and the pollen reward attracts beetles and flies.  Popular pollinators of carrion flowers are blowflies (Calliphoridae), house flies (Muscidae), flesh flies (Sarcophagidae) and varying types of beetles, due to the scents produced by the plant. Fly pollinators are typically attracted to pale, dull plants or those with translucent patches.  Additionally, these plants produce pollen, do not have present nectar guides and flowers resemble a funnel or complex trap. The host plant can sometimes trap the pollinator during the pollination/feeding  process.

Other plants with carrion-scented flowers 
Annonaceae
Asimina, commonly referred to as "pawpaw"
Sapranthus palanga
Apocynaceae
subtribe Stapeliinae: Boucerosia frerei, Caralluma, Duvalia, Echidnopsis, Edithcolea grandis, Hoodia, Huernia, Orbea, Piaranthus, Pseudolithos
Araceae
Arum dioscoridis, A. maculatum
Dracunculus vulgaris
Helicodiceros muscivorus
Lysichiton americanum
Symplocarpus foetidus
Aristolochiaceae
Aristolochia californica, A. grandiflora, A. microstoma, A. salvadorensis, A. littoralis
Hydnora
Asparagaceae
Eucomis bicolor
Balanophoraceae
Sarcophyte sanguinea subsp. sanguinea
Bignoniaceae
Crescentia alata
Burmanniaceae
Tiputinia foetida
Cytinaceae
Bdallophytum
Iridaceae
Moraea lurida
Ferraria crispa
Malvaceae
Sterculia foetida
Melanthiaceae
Trillium erectum, T. foetidissimum, T. sessile, T. stamineum
Orchidaceae
Satyrium pumilum
Masdevallia elephanticeps, M. angulata, M. colossus, M. picea

See also
 Stinkhorn — fungi that use the same basic principle for spore dispersal
 Aseroe rubra — fungi that use the same basic principle for spore dispersal

References

External links
 All about stinking flowers
 Carrion and Dung Mimicry in Plants

Plant common names
Pollination